The 2018 Home Hardware Canada Cup was held December 5–9 at Affinity Place in Estevan, Saskatchewan. The tournament winners qualified for the 2021 Canadian Olympic Curling Pre-Trials.

Both the men's and women's events have a total purse of $70,000 with the winners receiving $14,000 and the runners up winning $9,000.

Men

Teams
A revised version of the World Curling Tour's Order of Merit ranking system, allowing the many new teams for the 2018–19 curling season to carry over points individual players earned on their former teams, as of May 1, 2018, was used to qualify the first six men's teams. Team Dunstone qualified as the top-ranking non-qualified team on the Canadian Team Ranking System as of November 11, 2018.

Round-robin standings
Final round-robin standings

Round-robin results

Draw 1
Wednesday, December 5, 9:00 am

Draw 2
Wednesday, December 5, 2:00 pm

Draw 3
Wednesday, December 5, 7:00 pm

Draw 4
Thursday, December 6, 9:00 am

Draw 5
Thursday, December 6, 2:00 pm

Draw 6
Thursday, December 6, 7:00 pm

Draw 7
Friday, December 7, 9:00 am

Draw 8
Friday, December 7, 2:00 pm

Draw 9
Friday, December 7, 7:00 pm

Tiebreaker
Saturday, December 8, 9:00 am

Playoffs

Semifinal
Saturday, December 8, 2:00 pm

Final
Sunday, December 9, 7:00 pm

Player percentages
After Round Robin Play; Includes games played at other positions

Women

Teams
A revised version of the World Curling Tour's Order of Merit ranking system, allowing the many new teams for the 2018–19 curling season to carry over points individual players earned on their former teams, as of May 1, 2018, was used to qualify the first six teams. However, due to a virtual tie, a seventh women's teams was invited using this method. Team Flaxey qualified as the top-ranking non-qualified team on the Canadian Team Ranking System as of November 11, 2018. Team Tracy Fleury had qualified for the event, but had to decline as they were representing Canada at the Second Leg of the 2018–19 Curling World Cup.

Round-robin standings
Final round-robin standings

Round-robin results

Draw 1
Wednesday, December 5, 9:00 am

Draw 2
Wednesday, December 5, 2:00 pm

Draw 3
Wednesday, December 5, 7:00 pm

Draw 4
Thursday, December 6, 9:00 am

Draw 5
Thursday, December 6, 2:00 pm

Draw 6
Thursday, December 6, 7:00 pm

Draw 7
Friday, December 7, 9:00 am

Draw 8
Friday, December 7, 2:00 pm

Draw 9
Friday, December 7, 7:00 pm

Draw 10
Saturday, December 8, 9:00 am

Playoffs

Semifinal
Saturday, December 8, 8:00 pm

Final
Sunday, December 9, 2:00 pm

Player percentages
After Round Robin

References

External links

Canada Cup (curling)
Canada Cup
Canada Cup
Curling competitions in Saskatchewan
Sport in Estevan
Canada Cup